This is a list of publicly accessible, motorable passes in the Mpumalanga province, South Africa.
See Mountain Passes of South Africa

Mpumalanga
Mountain passes
Mountain passes of Mpumalanga
Mountain passes of Mpumalanga